Tofta is a locality situated in Varberg Municipality, Halland County, Sweden with 386 inhabitants in 2010.

References 

Populated places in Varberg Municipality